Wigram Aerodrome  is located in the Christchurch suburb of Sockburn, later to be split-suburb of Wigram and now split again as Wigram Skies. It was gifted by Sir Henry Wigram for the Canterbury (NZ) Aviation Company on 20 September 1916 and originally named Sockburn Airport. 
In 1923 that was then gifted to the Crown as a Royal New Zealand Air Force base. 
Charles Kingsford Smith made the first Trans-Tasman flight from Sydney to Wigram on 10 September 1928.

Sir Henry Wigram continued to support the base, gifting a further 81 acres of land in 1932. But aircraft got bigger and needed longer and eventually tarsealed runways. The Crown added to the original size of the airfield and that addition was land belonging to Ngāi Tahu. That just includes where the Control Tower currently still stands.  
  
RNZAF Wigram was home to the Central Flying School, Pilot Training Squadron, Navigation Training and recruit training. In 1953 RNZAF Wigram was the scene of the worst RNZAF crash in New Zealand when two RNZAF De Havilland Devon collided coming in to land and seven men were killed.

In the 1990s, the government wanted to rationalise their military property and a decision was made to either close Wigram or RNZAF Woodbourne near Blenheim. Despite having just been renovated at great expense, it was decide to close Wigram. The aircraft and squadrons moved to RNZAF Ohakea and recruit training went to Woodbourne. The closing parade was held on 14 September 1995.

Wigram Aerodrome maintained its aviation character, with several aviation businesses using its facilities. These included Pionair Private Aircharter, Christchurch Parachute School and Christchurch Flying School. 
Three Air Training Corps units, and a Cadet Corps unit also presently occupy buildings within the aerodrome.

Christchurch's Air Force Museum of New Zealand is located at the northern side of the aerodrome. It houses a large collection of aircraft and interactive displays, and is the only museum of the RNZAF in New Zealand.

Wigram Airfield Circuit was a temporary motor racing circuit at the Wigram Airfield.

The RNZAF still owns the original gifted part of the airfield and it is now the home of the Air Force Museum and Historic Flight. But the majority of the airfield, control tower, hangars and new fire station was returned to Ngāi Tahu Property as part of a treaty settlement claim. The fire station became the home of the civilian fire service until 2018. Since 2008 the Ngāi Tahu land has become the suburb of Wigram Skies.

Closure
On 9 July 2008 Television 3 News broadcast a news item stating that Ngāi Tahu, the owners of the aerodrome (acquired as part of a Treaty of Waitangi settlement claim) would close Wigram Aerodrome by February 2009. Wigram airfield officially ceased operation as an airfield at 00:00 Sunday 1 March 2009 NZ Local time.

After the Christchurch earthquakes of February 2011 resulted in much of the Central Business District being off limits due to earthquake damage with office buildings largely damaged, destroyed, or inaccessible, Ngāi Tahu moved its offices to the Wigram site using a mix of prefabricated relocatable buildings, and a refurbished Control Tower building to house most of its staff until a permanent long-term solution could be found.

Housing development
In late 2009, Ngāi Tahu Property began redeveloping the Wigram aerodrome site as a new housing development. Named Wigram Skies, the development proposes 1600 residential sections, a shopping centre, and an industrial area in the east adjoining the existing industrial area. The aerodrome's old sealed runway forms the development's main street, aptly named The Runway, with other street names having an aviation, flight or sky theme. The historic control tower and hangars remain as they are heritage protected buildings.

References

External links
RNZAF Central Flying School
Air force Museum
Pionair Air Charter
Canterbury Aero Club

Photo of an Air Force refresher course at Wigram c1926
Wigram air traffic to end

Defunct airports in New Zealand
Transport in Christchurch
Transport buildings and structures in Canterbury, New Zealand